Cristatogobius is a genus of gobies native to the western Pacific Ocean.

Species
There are currently five recognized species in this genus:
 Cristatogobius albius T. R. Chen, 1959
 Cristatogobius aurimaculatus Akihito & Meguro, 2000
 Cristatogobius lophius Herre, 1927
 Cristatogobius nonatoae (Ablan, 1940)
 Cristatogobius rubripectoralis Akihito, Meguro & Ka. Sakamoto, 2003 (Redfin crestedgoby)

References

Gobiidae